Carolyn Lee Hennesy (born June 10, 1962) is an American actress, author and animal advocate. Hennesy's early work consisted of guest appearances and roles in shows and television movies, including Dark Justice and in Deadly Invasion: The Killer Bee Nightmare. She rose to prominence when she was cast in a recurring role in Dawson's Creek. She followed this with a series of guest appearances until she gained international acclaim after landing the role of Diane Miller on the daytime television series General Hospital, for which she earned two Daytime Emmy Award nominations. Following this, she was cast in more recurring roles in shows such as Cougar Town, Revenge and Jessie. She also received much credibility for her role in The Bay, for which she won her first Daytime Emmy Award.

Hennesy has also taken up writing, and made her debut as an author with the 2011 novel The Secret Life of Damian Spinelli, featuring characters from General Hospital, which reached #16 on the New York Times Best Seller list. She is also known for her work as an advocate for animals, notable for her work promoting AZA zoos and aquariums, as well as promoting accredited marine parks like SeaWorld.

Early life
Hennesy was born on June 10, 1962, in Encino, California. She is the daughter of production designer and art director Dale Hennesy, who won an Academy Award for Best Art Direction for the 1966 film Fantastic Voyage.

Career
Hennesy starred as Mrs. Valentine on the teen drama Dawson's Creek in the 2000–2001 season, and she had supporting roles in the films Global Effect (2002), Terminator 3: Rise of the Machines (2003), Legally Blonde 2: Red, White and Blonde (2003), Click (2006), The Heat Chamber (2003) and Cougar Club (2007). She made three appearances on That '70s Show and has guest-starred on Reba as the mother of Reba's son-in-law, Van. She made a guest appearance on Drake & Josh as Mrs. Abernathy, the boss of the Ball & Vance Fish Corp. Additionally, she appeared as Judith Haven in an episode of What I Like About You. She starred as Rosalyn Harris in the fifth season of HBO hit series True Blood. In 2016, she joined the cast of the Netflix production Gilmore Girls: A Year in the Life.

Since 2006, Hennessy has played Diane Miller on the daytime soap opera General Hospital. She was nominated for a Daytime Emmy Award for the role in 2010. Hennesy wrote the 2011 novel The Secret Life of Damian Spinelli featuring characters from General Hospital. The novel reached #16 on the New York Times Best Seller list. In October 2011, Hennesy appeared on Jessie as Mrs. Chesterfield, a role she would reprise through the series' entire four-year run, and in November 2011 as Myrna in the "That Still Small Voice" episode of Once Upon a Time. She also guest starred in Bucket & Skinner's Epic Adventures.

Hennesy has written a series of children's books based on the character Pandora. The first one, called Pandora Gets Jealous, was released January 2008. The sequel, Pandora Gets Vain, was released August 2008. The third book in the series, Pandora Gets Lazy, released March 2009. Book four, Pandora Gets Heart, was released in January 2010. The fifth book, Pandora Gets Angry, was released in February 2011. Book six, Pandora Gets Greedy, was released in June 2012. Book seven, Pandora Gets Frightened, was released in 2013.

In 2016, Hennesy appeared in the soap opera web series The Bay as Karen Blackwell. She won a Daytime Emmy Award for Outstanding Supporting or Guest Actress in a Digital Daytime Drama Series for the role. Also in 2016, Hennesy was named an American Humane Association celebrity ambassador and spoke before a congressional committee on the organization's new humane conservation initiative. Hennesy is also the producer and host of Animal Magnetism, a radio program featuring wildlife and domestic animal professionals. The program focuses on welfare and conservation issues and examines both the human-animal bond and the global increase in human-wildlife conflict resulting from human over-population growth and climate change.

Personal life
Hennesy is the niece of actress Barbara Rush and cousin of Fox News reporter Claudia Cowan. She lives in Los Angeles. In 2007, Hennesy married Donald Agnelli. They divorced in 2013. She is a trapeze artist, a skill she demonstrated during a 2015 episode of Jessie. She has two brothers; one of whom, Scott Hennesy, works at Disney as an imagineer.

Filmography

Film

Television

Web

Video games

Awards and nominations

References

External links

 
 
 Interview with Carolyn Hennesy, The Spectrum, Accessed July 13, 2017.

1962 births
Living people
American film actresses
American soap opera actresses
American television actresses
People from Encino, Los Angeles
American voice actresses
American women writers
Actresses from Los Angeles
Writers from Los Angeles
20th-century American actresses
21st-century American actresses